Grigoriy Zakharovich Bronza (30 April 192730 January 2010) was a prominent artist of Transnistria (Pridnestrovian Moldavian Republic). He was an art restorer and an honorary member of the Transnistria Union of Artists. Bronza was a designer of postage stamps of Transnistria and Moldova. He also helped create a number of museums in the former Soviet Union.

World War II 
During World War II, Grigoriy Bronza served in the Red Army and was awarded the following Soviet military decorations:
 Order of the Patriotic War,
 Medal for Battle Merit,
 Medal "For the Victory over Germany in the Great Patriotic War 1941–1945",
Medal "For the Victory over Japan".

Postage stamps 
Bronza is the author of the first stamps of Moldova issued in June 1991. He designed the first stamps of the Pridnestrovian Moldavian Republic issued in December 1993. Bronza designed the third definitive stamp issue of Transnistria (1997). He also created a series of stamps for the 5th anniversary of the events in Bendery (1997), a series of stamps "Historical and modern coats of arms of cities of Transnistria" (1999), the 200th anniversary of Alexander Pushkin issue (1999), etc.

See also 
 Postage stamps and postal history of Moldova
 Postage stamps and postal history of Transnistria

References

External links 
 Moldavian postage stamps
 Moldova rare postage stamps

1927 births
2010 deaths
Moldovan artists
Russian stamp designers
Philately of Moldova
Philately of Transnistria
Conservator-restorers